Thomas Chatterton was MP for Petersfield from  1572 to 1583.

References

People from Petersfield
English MPs 1572–1583